Fantastic Locations: Hellspike Prison is an adventure module for the 3.5 edition of the Dungeons & Dragons fantasy role-playing game.

Plot summary
In Fantastic Locations: Hellspike Prison, the player characters must thwart the plans of a fiend whose secrets to power over a realm are hidden in an obelisk called the Hellspike.

Publication history
Fantastic Locations: Hellspike Prison was written by Matthew Sernett, and was published in November 2005. Cover art was by Francis Tsai, with interior art by Wayne England.

References

Dungeons & Dragons modules
Role-playing game supplements introduced in 2005